The 1989 Seniors' British Open, by sponsor reasons also known as the  Volvo Seniors' British Open, was a professional golf tournament for players aged 50 and above and the third Seniors' British Open (later known as the Senior Open Championship), held from 27 to 30 July at Turnberry Golf Resort in South Ayrshire, Scotland, United Kingdom.

In 2018, the tournament was, as all Senior British Open Championships played 1987–2002, retroactively recognized as a senior major golf championship and a PGA Tour Champions (at the time named the Senior PGA Tour) event.

Bob Charles, with an 11-under-par score of 269, won by seven strokes ahead of Billy Casper, to capture his first Senior British Open title and first senior major championship.

Defending champion Gary Player finished tied 4th, 13 strokes behind the winner.

A £2,000 bonus prize was awarded to 64-year-old Christy O'Connor Snr, as the leading player over 60 years of age, at tied 8th at 284, 4 over par.

Leading amateurs were Gordon Clark and Charlie Green, tied at 299, 19 over par.

Venue 

The Ailsa Course at Turnberry, situated 80 kilometres south of Glasgow, Scotland, on headland along the Firth of Clyde, overlooking the Isle of Arran and Ailsa Craig, was initially opened with 13 holes in 1901, designed by Willie Fernie, and later completed to 18 holes. It was redesigned by Mackenzie Ross between 1949 and 1951. 

The championship was the third of four in a row played at Turnberry.

The course had previously hosted The Open Championship twice; 1977 and 1986.

Field

Past champions in the field
Both of the two past Senior British Open champions participated and made the 36-hole cut, 1988 champion Gary Player (tied 4th) and 1987 champion Neil Coles (6th).

Past winners and runners-up at The Open Championship in the field
The field included three former winners of The Open Championship. All of them made the cut, Bob Charles (won), Gary Player (tied 4th) and Arnold Palmer (8th).

The field also included three former runners-up at The Open Championship. Neil Coles (6th), Christy O'Connor Snr (7th) and Doug Sanders (tied 24th).

Final results 
Sunday, 30 July 1989

Source:

References

External links 
 Coverage on European Tour website

Senior major golf championships
Golf tournaments in Scotland
Seniors' British Open
Seniors' British Open
Seniors' British Open